FUEL TV  is a Portuguese-owned digital cable and satellite television action sports channel owned by FUEL TV Global, S.A. The channel is available in many countries including Portugal, China, North Africa and the Middle East.

Development 
FUEL TV was launched in 2003 by FOX. In 2007, the 100% Portuguese-owned company FLUID Youth Culture, S.A. reached an agreement with FOX in order to represent FUEL TV in Portugal. The following year, FUEL TV was launched in Portugal in partnership with the network service provider MEO.

In the period between 2010 and 2014, the companies expanded their business to the EMEA region. FUEL TV EMEA, S.A. (former FLUID Youth Culture, S.A.) launched FUEL TV in over 40 countries in the EMEA region, reaching 8 million households. In 2014, FUEL TV EMEA acquired the channel from FOX. Since then, the channel has been launched in 100 countries around the world, including China where it was launched in February 2018, and has reached over 500 million people.

Today, FUEL TV is present in over 102 countries in Europe, Asia, Oceania, Africa and Central America. FUEL TV is also available for free in Brazilian territory through the Pluto TV streaming service, with subtitles in Brazilian Portuguese.

Shows 
Breaking Trail
Action Sports Plus
FirstHand
Built to Shred
The Kickback
The Moto
Inside the Outdoors
Drive Thru Australia
Pull
Camp Woodward
Custom
Camp James

Availability 

Portugal: In Portugal it is available on cable, satellite and IPTV platforms. It covers national and international action sports events, including skate, surfing, bodyboarding and mountain biking which are popular in Portugal.
Republic of Ireland: The channel launched in Ireland through Vodafone TV on 20 January 2016.

References 

Television channels and stations established in 2008
Television stations in Portugal
Portuguese-language television stations
Fox Sports